Rechie Valdez (born ) is a Canadian entrepreneur, television personality, and politician. She was elected to the House of Commons of Canada in the 2021 federal election representing Mississauga—Streetsville as a member of the Liberal Party of Canada. She is the first Filipino Canadian woman, and second Filipino Canadian after former Manitoba Liberal MP Rey Pagtakhan, to be elected as a Member of Parliament in Canada.

Career
Valdez spent some few years in the financial sector before venturing in business. She owned a baking business, had competed in The Big Bake on Food Network Canada, and hosted and produced a television show Fearlessly Creative on Filipino TV.

Personal life
She is married to Christopher Valdez, and has two children. Outside politics, Valdez plays basketball as a hobby, where she once held a basketball fundraising activity for Montreal Children's Hospital and SickKids in Toronto.

Election results

References

External links

Members of the House of Commons of Canada from Ontario
21st-century Canadian politicians
21st-century Canadian women politicians
Living people
Canadian politicians of Filipino descent
Liberal Party of Canada MPs
Women members of the House of Commons of Canada
Businesspeople from Ontario
Canadian women in business
Canadian bankers
Politicians from Mississauga
Year of birth missing (living people)